Fanhe Town (also called Tieling New City, Fanhe New District, Tieling New District) is a recently developed town in Tieling County, where the buildings of the government of Tieling City are located in.

Sightseeing
Lotus Lake Wetland Park

Education
Tieling High School

References

External links

Towns in Liaoning

Tieling